Sire Philippe Van Dievoet called Vandive, écuyer, (1654–1738) was a celebrated goldsmith and jeweller. He was goldsmith to King Louis XIV, councillor of the King, officier de la Garde Robe du Roi (officer of the King's wardrobe), trustee of the Hôtel de ville of Paris, and Consul of Paris.

Ennoblement 
Sire Philippe Van Dievoet called Vandive, as an officier de la Garde Robe du Roi (officer of the King's wardrobe), benefitted from personal Nobility along with the title of Ecuyer during his tenure from 1680 until 1711.

Name 
Depending on the source, the name of Philippe Van Dievoet was changed to Vandive either by the Dauphin of whom he had been the jeweller, or by his father, King Louis XIV. Before that, it was briefly written as Vandivout, in an attempt to franchise the name.

Family 

He married at Paris Anne Martinot (died 1707), daughter of Balthazar Martinot (1636–1716), clockmaker to Queen Anna of Austria and then to the King.

He was a brother of the sculptor Peter Van Dievoet (1661–1729) and father of the printer Guillaume Vandive.

He formed the Vandive family, the Parisian branch of the Van Dievoet family of Brussels.

See also 

Nicolas Félix Vandive

Notes and references

Further reading 

Almanach royal.
Archives nationales, Z,6OI5, fol-46 v°: référence mentionnée par J.-J. Guiffrey dans Nouvelles archives de l'art français, Paris, 1873, p. 260.
 Baron (procureur), Mémoire pour Nicolas Simart, marchand libraire à Paris, et damoiselle Eléonore Prieur, son épouse, tuteurs conjointement de damoiselle Charlotte-Eléonore Vandive etc., Paris, 1727 (Bibliothèque nationale de France, coté FOL-FM-18408).
 Michèle Bimbenet-Privat, Les orfèvres et l’orfèvrerie de Paris au XVII e siècle, Paris, 2002, 2 vol., passim.
Nicolas de Blégny, alias Abraham Du Pradel, Le livre commode des adresses de Paris pour 1692, suivi d’appendices, précédé d’une introduction, et annoté par Édouard Fournier, Paris, 1878, 2 vol.
 François Bluche, Louis XIV, Paris, Fayard, 2002, p. 528.
 Yvonne Brunel, Marie-Adélaïde de Savoie, duchesse de Bourgogne, 1685-1712, 1974, p. 59 et 253.
 Stéphane Castelluccio, Les collections royales d’objets d’art de François Ier à la Révolution, Paris, 2002, p. 136.
Hélène Cavalié née d'Escayrac-Lauture, Pierre Germain dit le Romain (1703–1783). Vie d'un orfèvre et de son entourage, Paris, 2007, thèse de l'École des Chartes, tome I, pp. 209, 210, 345, 350, 429, 447.
 Paul-Eugène Claessens et Julien Cuypers, « Quand Bruxelles ravagée renaît plus belle sous les ailes de l’archange : le sculpteur Pierre van Dievoet, son œuvre et sa famille », dans L’Intermédiaire des Généalogistes, n° 121, 1966, pp. 39 à 41.
Philippe de Courcillon de Dangeau, Journal du marquis de Dangeau, publié par Soulié, Dussieux, Chennevières, Mantz, Montaiglon, Paris, Firmin-Didot, 1854–1860, vol. VII, 1699–1700, jeudi 12 mars 1699, p. 44. Son nom y est orthographié Vendives.
 Wilfred Joseph Cripps, Old French Plate- its Makers and Marks, Londres, 1920, p. 52 (concerne Balthazar Philippe Vendive -sic-, garde 1735-1736)
 P. L. Jacob, XVIIe siècle, lettres, sciences et arts, France, 1590-1700, Paris, Firmin-Didot, 1882, p. 540 (orthographié erronément Vandine)
Paul Lacroix (Bibliophile Jacob) et Ferdinand Seré, Histoire de l'orfèvrerie-joaillerie, Paris, 1850, p. 164.
 Évelyne Legond, « Monseigneur », dans Dictionnaire du Grand Siècle, publié sous la direction de François Bluche, Paris, 1990, pp. 1051–1052.
 Victor Legrand, Juges et Consuls, Paris, 1899–1901, pp. 147–148, ainsi que Charles Ginoux, « Les orfèvres de Paris, officiers municipaux », dans Revue de l’Art Français Ancien et Moderne, n°3, Paris, mars 1885, pp. 40 et 215.
 Henri Lengellé dit Tardy, Dictionnaire des horlogers français, Paris, 1972, pp. 437–445.
 Alfred Marie, Jeanne Marie, "Mansart à Versailles", dans Versailles son histoire, t. II, 1972, p. 635 (sous la graphie Vandivout).
 Abbé Jacques-Rémi-Antoine Texier, Dictionnaire d'orfèvrerie, de gravure et de ciselure chrétiennes, ou de la Mise en œuvre artistique des métaux, des émaux et des pierreries, Petit-Montrouge, J.-P. Migne, 1857. Il est cité à l’article « Garde ».
 Dirk Van der Cruysse, Chardin le Persan, Paris, Fayard, p. 29.
 A. Van Dievoet, « Généalogie de la famille van Dievoet originaire de Bruxelles, dite van Dive à Paris », dans Le Parchemin, 1986, n°245, pp. 273–293.
 A. Van Dievoet, « Un disciple belge de Grinling Gibbons, le sculpteur Pierre van Dievoet (1661-1729) et son œuvre à Londres et Bruxelles », dans Le Folklore Brabançon, mars 1980, n° 225, pp. 65–91.
 A. Van Dievoet, « Quand le savoir-faire des orfèvres bruxellois brillait à Versailles », dans Cahiers bruxellois, Bruxelles, 2004, pp. 19–66. Cet article contient une abondante bibliographie et de nombreuses références et retranscriptions de documents d'archives.
 Nicole Verlet, « Orfèvrerie », dans Dictionnaire du Grand Siècle, publié sous la direction de François Bluche, Paris, 1990, p. 1131.
 Roger-Armand Weigert et Carl Hernmarck, « Les relations artistiques entre la France et la Suède 1693-1718. Nicodème Tessin le jeune et Daniel Cronström. Correspondance (extraits) », dans Nationalmuseum, Skriftserie 10, Stockholm, 1964.

External links 

The history of the family of goldsmith Philipe van Dievoet
Magazine Silverbel: UNE FAMILLE D’ORFEVRES D’ORIGINE BRUXELLOISE A PARIS: LES VAN DIEVOET DITS VANDIVE.

1654 births
1738 deaths
Businesspeople from Brussels
Belgian goldsmiths
Belgian silversmiths
Belgian jewellers
Philippe
Material culture of royal courts